Joong Archen Aydin (also known as Chen, born 10 March 2001) is a Thai actor and singer. He moved to Turkey with his mother when he was very young. He came back to Thailand to act while in high school. He is best known for his role as Khabkluen in the Star and Sky series. Joong first starred as Ming in 2Moons2 in 2019.

Early Life 

Joong was born in Thailand but moved with his mother and stepfather to Turkey when he was eight years old.  He lived in Turkey for ten years and can speak fluent Turkish. Joong endured serious abuse and bullying while living in Turkey. Joong has spoken about how such traumatic experiences shaped him into a resilient adult.

Joong returned to Thailand as a teenager to pursue his dreams of joining the entertainment industry. Joong previously studies Creative Media Design at Stamford International University in Bangkok, also known as STIU. In addition to Thai and Turkish, Joong also speaks fluent English and basic Chinese. 

On 10th March 2023, he updated his studies. He currently study at Bangkok University. He choose School of Communication Arts Majoring in Broadcasting and Streaming Media Production.

Joong won "Mister Teen Thailand" in 2018.

Career

2019–2020: Acting debut, OXQ 
Joong became an actor by signing a contract with the Motive Village company and debuted by playing the role of Ming in 2Moons2 on June 29, 2019.

Joong reprised his role as Ming in "2Moons2 Special: Before the Moon Rises" which aired on June 22, 2019.

On February 5, 2020, Joong and the rest of the main cast of 2Moons2 hosted the show, "Travel with Us".

Joong also became a member of the Thai boy group, OXQ which debuted on June 4, 2020, with Motive Village. Joong was the group's visual, lead dancer, and lead vocalist. A game show starring Joong and the rest of OXQ, called "OXQKRAB", aired on July 2, 2020.

2020 - 2021 : Insight Entertainment 

In November of 2020, Joong revealed that he became an Insight Entertainment trainee, confirming his departure from Motive Village and OXQ.

On January 2021, Joong announced that he will not continue with his role as Ming in the upcoming sequel, "2Moons3". The company later confirmed that none of the original actors from the 2Moons series would reprise their roles as main characters.

2021 - Present : GMMTV 

On September 12, Joong indirectly announced through his Twitter and Instagram account that he was now with GMMTV as its newest talent, thus announcing both his departure from Insight Entertainment and the group's pre-debut from that company.

On December 1, the press conference for GMMTV 2022: Borderless was broadcast. It was revealed that Joong will co-star in a new series, Star & Sky: Star in My Mind, with Dunk Natachai. The official trailer for the series was released on March 23, 2022, while they were filming a variety show, Safe House SS3 : Best Bros.

On April 7, the day before the series' premiere, the OST was released, "My Starlight," which was sung by Joong. The series receives a lot of love from fans all over the world. Despite the fact that the series only had eight episodes, the response was positive. Joong and Dunk also were given the opportunity to hold a concert along with Earth, Mix, Pond, and Phuwin at the Feel Fan Fun Camping Concert on October 15. GMMTV also released a lot of merchandise under the JoongDunk brand with their official logo and fandom color. They already established the fandom name, "Dungjang," early on in their partnership and added an exclusive logo and the fandom's color, yellow, along the way. They also held JoongDunk's first fan meeting in Cambodia before the year ended. The tickets for the fan meeting were sold out within 15 minutes of their release. Upon their arrival, the fans waited outside the airport with banners and screamed.

On April 21, the drama "The Mafia Series: Guns and Freaks" aired, in which Joong starred as Beam. 

On July 3, Joong continued his role as Khabkluen in "Star and Sky: Sky in Your Heart". Joong also appeared in the Star and Sky Special Episode which aired on July 29, 2022.

Joong has appeared as a guest on several variety and game shows since his debut, including "Arm Share", "School Rangers", "Talk with ToeyS" and "Force Book Show Real Special". Joong is a regular member of the 2022 show, "Safe House 3: Best Bro Secret" along with his on-screen partner, Dunk Natachai.

On November 22, at the press conference for GMMTV 2023: Diversely Yours, Joong was revealed to appear in three series. Our Skyy 2 and Hidden Agenda with his on-screen partner, Dunk Natachai, while Wednesday Club with Ohm, Nani, Jane, Piploy, Kay, and Phuwin. 

Shining JoongDunk, a fan meeting in Vietnam, will kick off the year 2023 for Joong and Dunk. They also received the same warm welcome from Vietnamese fans as before. The fans screamed and chanted their names as they arrived at the airport.

Filmography

Television series

Variety Show

Music Videos Appearance

Discography

Awards and nominations

References

External links 
 
 
 
 

Archen Aydin
Archen Aydin
Archen Aydin
2001 births
Living people